is a passenger railway station located in the city of Matsuyama, Ehime Prefecture, Japan. It is operated by the private transportation company Iyotetsu.

Lines
During most of the day, railway trains arrive every fifteen minutes. Trains continue from Matsuyama City Station on the Yokogawara Line to Yokogawara Station.

Layout
Takahama Station is an above-ground station with a single side platform and one track and a siding, and is attended. The track that extends slightly from the back of the station building is used during the daytime as a storage line for additional cars during rush hours. At the north exit of the station, there is a connecting bus stop to Matsuyama Tourist Port.

History
Takahama Station was opened on 1 May 1892. In 1905 the station building was moved to its current location 500 meters north of its former location.

Surrounding area
Matsuyama Tourist Port
Takahama Port

See also
 List of railway stations in Japan

References

External links

Iyotetsu Station Information

Iyotetsu Takahama Line
Railway stations in Ehime Prefecture
Railway stations in Japan opened in 1892
Railway stations in Matsuyama, Ehime